Jimscaline (C-(4,5,6-trimethoxyindan-1-yl)methanamine) is a conformationally-restricted derivative of the cactus-derived hallucinogen mescaline, which was discovered in 2006 by a team at Purdue University led by David E. Nichols. It acts as a potent agonist for the 5-HT2A and 5-HT2C receptors with the more active (R)-enantiomer having a Ki of 69 nM at the human 5-HT2A receptor, and around three times the potency of mescaline in drug-substitution experiments in animals. This discovery that the side chain of the phenethylamine hallucinogens could be constrained to give chiral ligands with increased activity then led to the later development of the super-potent benzocyclobutene derivative TCB-2.

See also 
 AMMI
 2CB-Ind
 Mescaline

References 

Psychedelic phenethylamines
Indanes
Phenol ethers
Serotonin receptor agonists
Phenethylamines
Mescalines